Toyin Adegbola popularly known as Toyin Asewo to re mecca (born 28 December 1961) is a Nigerian film actress, producer and director.

Career
Toyin began her acting career in 1984 in the Yoruba language films of Nollywood. She is a member of the board of the Osun State Arts and Culture Council. She is a popular face in the Nollywood sector.

Personal life
Adegbola was married to a journalist Mr. Anthony Kolawole Adegbola who later died. She met her late husband when she was working in the Television House, Ibadan. At that time, Mr. Adegbola was working at NTA Lagos.  Adegbola has two children, a daughter, and a son; both live in Dublin, Ireland. She also has two grandchildren. On Saturday, 5 March 2016, she was conferred with a chieftaincy title as Yeye Meso of Oke-Irun, State of Osun, by His Royal Majesty Alayeluwa Oba Isaac Adetoyi Adetuluese Olokose 11.

Selected filmography
Asewo to re Mecca (1992)
Ayitale (2013)

Awards

Professional Excellence Award from Symbol of Hope Foundation from her performance in Asewo To Re Mecca.

References

Nigerian film actresses
Living people
1961 births
Yoruba actresses
Actresses in Yoruba cinema
Actresses from Osun State
20th-century Nigerian actresses
21st-century Nigerian actresses
People from Osun State
Nigerian film producers
Nigerian film directors
Nigerian women film producers
Nigerian women film directors
Nigerian television personalities